The White Dove (Spanish: La blanca Paloma) is a 1942 Spanish musical drama film directed by Claudio de la Torre and starring Juanita Reina, Tony D'Algy and Antonio Huelves. It was remade in 1955 as It Happened in Seville with Reina again in the role of Esperanza.

Cast
 Juanita Reina as Esperanza  
 Tony D'Algy as Juan Antonio 
 Antonio Huelves as Alberto  
 José Portes as Don Fernando  
 Dolores Bremón as Tita Pasión  
 Eloísa Mariscal as Martina  
 Isabel Urcola as Setefilla  
 Josefina de la Torre as La enfermera  
 Narciso Ojeda as Tachuelita  
 Rafael Ragel as Ponciles  
 Félix Fernández as Licenciado  
 José Andrés Vázquez as Don Ricardo

References

Bibliography 
  Eva Woods Peiró. White Gypsies: Race and Stardom in Spanish Musical Films. U of Minnesota Press, 2012.

External links 
 

1940s musical drama films
1942 films
1940s Spanish-language films
Films based on works by Alejandro Pérez Lugín
Films set in Seville
Spanish black-and-white films
Spanish musical drama films
1942 drama films
1940s Spanish films